Vefa is part of the district of Fatih in Istanbul, and lies inside what was once the old walled city of Constantinople. It lies roughly northwest of the eastern section of the Aqueduct of Valens, and is rich in monuments, both Byzantine and Ottoman. It takes its name from the Muslim saint (wali) Shaykh Ebu’l Vefa who is buried locally in his own mosque and dergah.

Vefa lies to the east of busy Atatürk Bulvari, the main road pushed through the old city by the French architect Henri Prost in the 1950s. Immediately to its north is the rundown area of Küçükpazarı while to the east is the Süleymaniye district around the huge Süleymaniye Mosque complex.

Buses plough up and down Atatürk Bulvari linking Vefa to Taksim, Eminönü, Fatih and Beyazıt. The Vezneciler Metro stop on the M2 line is a short walk away as is the Cibali tram stop on the Golden Horn.

Attractions 
Vefa is best known for the picturesque back-street Vefa Bozacısı shop, the oldest shop (founded in 1876) still selling boza, a barley drink usually topped off with chickpeas, in the city.Atatürk came here to drink boza and his cup is preserved in a showcase in the wall. The shop is mentioned several times in Orhan Pamuk's novel, A Strangeness in my Mind which tells the story of an itinerant boza-seller.

The Vefa Kilise Mosque (Vefa Church Mosque) is a small Byzantine church in the same area, probably originally dedicated to Hagios Theodoros (St Theodore). It dates back to the Middle Byzantine period of architecture in the 10th to 11th centuries. The church had been allowed to fall into complete neglect . However it has now been completely restored. Near the church is the brick-and-stone Atif Efendi Library, the second library to be built in Ottoman Constantinople in the 1740s. It, too, has been restored. Another early 18th-century library, commissioned by Damad Şehir Ali Paşa, stands in the grounds of Vefa High School (Vefa Lisesi), designed by architect Kemalettin Bey in the 1920s.

Not far from Vefa Bozacısı is the delightful Recai Mehmed Efendi sibyan mektep, an Ottoman primary school opened in 1775, its facade entirely covered in marble carvings that incorporate fountains and a sebil from which drinks were dispensed to passers-by. Nearby is the Ekmekcizade Ahmed Paşa Medresesi, an Ottoman theological school built no later than 1618 for a vizier of the sultan.

Near Vezneciler Metro stop is the large Kalenderhane Mosque which started life as the mainly Middle Byzantine church of Theotokos Kyriotissa and stands beside the slight remains of an early Byzantine bathhouse. Running along one side of the church is a stretch of the Aqueduct of Valens which used to bring water into the city from Thrace (Trakya) in Roman and Byzantine times.

Vefa is also home to Vefa S.K., one of Istanbul's historic soccer clubs.

Gallery

References 

Quarters of Fatih